The June 2017 Lashkargah bombing occurred on 22 June 2017, when a suicide attack took place in the New Kabul Bank branch in Lashkargah, capital of Helmand province in Afghanistan. During this attack, at least 34 people were killed and 60 were injured.

Attack
A suicide bomber detonated explosives at the entrance of the bank at 12 noon local time. The attackers succeeded entering the bank. A Taliban spokesman later issued a statement to journalists claiming responsibility for the attack.

References

2017 murders in Afghanistan
Building bombings in Afghanistan
Islamic terrorist incidents in 2017
June 2017 crimes in Asia
Mass murder in 2017
Mass murder in Afghanistan
Suicide bombings in Afghanistan
Terrorist incidents in Afghanistan in 2017
War in Afghanistan (2001–2021)
Attacks on buildings and structures in Afghanistan
Attacks in Afghanistan in 2017